The Women in Aviation International Pioneer Hall of Fame (Also WAI Pioneer Hall of Fame) was established in 1992 by Women in Aviation International to honor and recognize women who have made significant contributions in aviation. Its purpose is to honor women who have made significant contributions as record setters, pioneers, or innovators in the aviation and aerospace industries. WAI solicits nominations from throughout the aviation industry each year for the WAI Pioneer Hall of Fame. Inductees are chosen from the nominations by a committee, "with special consideration given to individuals who have helped other women become successful in aviation or opened doors of opportunity for other women." Women are inducted to the hall of fame at the conclusion of the WAI annual conference.

See also

 North American aviation halls of fame

References 

1992 establishments in Ohio
Aviation halls of fame
Halls of fame in Ohio
Women's halls of fame
Awards established in 1992
Tourist attractions in Preble County, Ohio
Lists of women
Women aviation pioneers